USS Gordius (ARL-36) was one of 39 Achelous-class landing craft repair ships built for the United States Navy during World War II. Named for Gordius (in mythology, first king of Phrygia), she was the only U.S. Naval vessel to bear the name.

Originally planned as LST-1145, was redesignated ARL-36 and named Gordius 27 October 1944 while building at Chicago Bridge & Iron Works, Seneca, Illinois. She was launched 7 May 1945 and sponsored by Mrs. Helen H. Davis. Placed in reduced commission 18 May 1945, the ship steamed to Baltimore, Maryland where she decommissioned 11 June. She was then converted to a landing craft repair vessel at the Key Shipyard, Bethlehem Steel Company. Gordius was placed in full commission 14 September 1945 at Baltimore.

Service history
Operating out of Amphibious Base, Little Creek, Virginia Gordius took up a regular schedule of exercises in Chesapeake Bay, and along the Virginia-North Carolina coast, supporting the myriad landing craft during amphibious operations. She also participated in winter maneuvers in the Caribbean. The ship occasionally sailed to the north Atlantic, taking part in training exercises off NS Argentia, Newfoundland, and Labrador in 1948 and 1949. Gordius also was a member of the annual resupply convoy to Thule, Greenland (11 June–27 August 1952), drawing special praise for her repair of LST-938 during adverse weather on the operation.

Gordius continued her work in support of amphibious training until steaming into Green Cove Springs, Florida 10 November 1955. She decommissioned 21 December 1955 and was placed in reserve.

Taken out of reserve in early 1968, she was stricken from the Naval Vessel Register 1 February and loaned to Iran under the Military Assistance Program 7 September 1961, where she served as IIS Sohrab (ARL-11). She was sunk as a target in 1974.

References

 
 

 

Achelous-class repair ships
Achelous-class repair ships converted from LST-542-class ships
World War II amphibious warfare vessels of the United States
Cold War auxiliary ships of the United States
Ships built in Seneca, Illinois
1945 ships
Ships transferred from the United States Navy to the Imperial Iranian Navy
Ships sunk as targets